Miss Supranational Nicaragua

The Nuestra Belleza Nicaragua contest is the national beauty pageant of Nicaragua to select the winner to different beauty pageants.

Miss Earth Nicaragua  
Color key

Miss Supranational Nicaragua  
Color key

Miss Intercontinental Nicaragua

See also
Miss Nicaragua
Miss Mundo Nicaragua

External links
Official page

Beauty pageants in Nicaragua
Nicaraguan awards